The Sovereign (or Sovereign Apartments) is a residential skyscraper in the East Midtown neighborhood of Manhattan in New York City, near the border with the Upper East Side. It is located at 425 East 58th Street east of First Avenue. The skyscraper was designed by Emery Roth & Sons in the International Style architectural style.

References

External links 
 Official website

Midtown Manhattan
Residential skyscrapers in Manhattan
Residential buildings completed in 1973
1973 establishments in New York City
International Style (architecture)